Zhang Rongrui (born March 8, 1996) is a Chinese curler. He competed at the 2015 Ford World Men's Curling Championship in Halifax, Nova Scotia, Canada, as alternate for the Chinese team, which placed 8th in the tournament.

References

External links

1996 births
Living people
Chinese male curlers